Wandsworth Central was a parliamentary constituency in the Wandsworth district of South London.  It returned one Member of Parliament (MP) to the House of Commons of the Parliament of the United Kingdom, elected by the first-past-the-post voting system.

The constituency was created for the 1918 general election, and abolished for the February 1974 general election.

Boundaries 

When the constituency was created, in 1918, it was a division of the Metropolitan Borough of Wandsworth. It was in a part of the County of London, which was located in the northern part of the historic county of Surrey.

In 1965 the area of the constituency became part of the London Borough of Wandsworth in Greater London.

1918–1950: During the 1885-1918 distribution of parliamentary seats, the area had been part of the Wandsworth constituency. In 1918 the Metropolitan Borough (a larger area than the Wandsworth constituency had been) was split into five divisions. In addition to Central these divisions were Balham and Tooting, Clapham, Putney and Streatham.

The Central constituency comprised the Fairfield and Springfield wards of the Metropolitan Borough, as they existed in 1918.

The constituency was surrounded by the River Thames to the north, Battersea South to the east, Balham and Tooting to the south-east and south, Wimbledon to the south-west and Putney to the west.

1950–1974: In the redistribution, which took effect with the 1950 United Kingdom general election, the Metropolitan Borough was re-arranged into four divisions. The Balham and Tooting constituency was the one which disappeared.

Tooting ward and part of Balham ward were included in the redrawn Central seat. Springfield ward remained from the old Central division. Fairfield ward was transferred to the Putney constituency. The rest of Balham ward remained in the Clapham constituency.

The effect of these changes was to combine the southern part of the old Central, with the former Balham and Tooting. This moved the boundaries of this constituency south and east from those in the previous distribution.

The constituency was surrounded by Battersea South to the north, Clapham to the north-east, Streatham to the east, Mitcham in the south, Wimbledon to the south-west and Putney to the north-west.

In the 1974 re-distribution, which was the first after the local government boundary changes in 1965,  the London Borough (with significantly different boundaries from the old Metropolitan Borough) was divided into four seats. Those were Battersea North, Battersea South, Putney and Tooting. The Springfield and Tooting wards were included in the Tooting constituency, with the Balham ward being included in Battersea South.

Members of Parliament

Election results 
Swing is only calculated when the same two parties, as in the previous election, share first and second place. Votes for other candidates are ignored in the calculation of Butler swing. A positive swing is from Labour towards the Conservative candidate and a negative swing is from Conservative towards a Labour candidate.

Elections in the 1910s 
General election of 1918

Elections in the 1920s

Elections in the 1930s

Elections in the 1940s 
 Creation of Nathan as the 1st Lord Nathan

By-election of 1940

 Note (1940): Bevin was the Minister of Labour and National Service at the time of his election. Under an agreement between the three parties comprising the wartime coalition, the parties which had not represented a seat when it became vacant would not contest the by-election.

General election of 1945

Elections in the 1950s 
 There were major boundary changes, which came into effect, at the 1950 election (for details see the Boundaries section above).

Elections in the 1960s

Elections in the 1970s 

 Constituency abolished (1974)

References 
 Boundaries of Parliamentary Constituencies 1885-1972, compiled and edited by F.W.S. Craig (Parliamentary Reference Publications 1972)
 British Parliamentary Election Results 1918-1949, compiled and edited by F.W.S. Craig (Macmillan Press, revised edition 1977)
 British Parliamentary Election Results 1950-1973, compiled and edited by F.W.S. Craig (Parliamentary Research Services 1983).
 Who's Who of British Members of Parliament, Volume III 1919-1945, edited by M. Stenton and S. Lees (Harvester Press 1979)
 Who's Who of British Members of Parliament, Volume IV 1945-1979, edited by M. Stenton and S. Lees (Harvester Press 1981)

Footnotes 

Parliamentary constituencies in London (historic)
Constituencies of the Parliament of the United Kingdom established in 1918
Constituencies of the Parliament of the United Kingdom disestablished in 1974